Laurence Borremans (born 4 February 1978 in Limal, a part of Wavre) was Miss Belgium 1996  and a semi-finalist at the Miss World pageant.

References

1978 births
Belgian beauty pageant winners
Living people
Miss Universe 1997 contestants
Miss World 1996 delegates
People from Wavre
Walloon people
Miss Belgium winners